Rhagium sycophanta is a species of beetle in the family Cerambycidae. It was described by Schrank in 1781.

References

Lepturinae
Beetles described in 1781